Paul Anthony Williams (born 7 August 1992) is a New Zealand comedian and musician. Williams plays the role of Taskmaster's assistant on the New Zealand version of the international television series Taskmaster, and is one of the show's principal writers. He was nominated for the 2017 Billy T Award for up-and-coming New Zealand comedians for his stand-up comedy.

Early life
Williams grew up in Nelson, New Zealand, with his parents Gary and Roseanne, and his two siblings, including comedian brother Guy. He was educated at Nelson College. He performed leading roles in musical theatre with The Nelson Youth Theatre Company, and published comedy raps with music videos on YouTube. Williams studied musical theatre at Whitireia Performance Centre in Wellington, and at the end of 2013 moved to Auckland.

Career

Comedy 

Williams' comedy show “Summertime Love”, presented as a mock dating seminar, went on tour through New Zealand and to the Edinburgh Festival Fringe and Melbourne International Comedy Festival. He was nominated for the Billy T. Award for the country's best newcomer in 2017. Since 2017, he has co-hosted the basketball-themed Advanced Analytics NBA Podcast with his brother Guy.

TV 
Williams is a presenter of Taskmaster NZ (with Jeremy Wells) and one of the three writers of the tasks and script for the show. He was reviewed as the programme's "most valuable player", and has returned for the second season, with praise for his "underplayed comedy" in the role. His brother Guy, who is also a comedian, was a contestant on the first season.

He stars in the TVNZ comedy series Kid Sister along with Our Flag Means Death writer Simone Nathan.

Music 

As a musician, Williams released some early albums of comedy and parody, before moving on to writing and performing original songs.  In a 2014 radio interview with The Edge, New Zealand singer Lorde said that Williams was her favourite performer. 

Williams has released several albums of his own songs, including the EPs Songs about Girls (2014) and Jungle River Adventure (2015). His full-length album Surf Music (2018) was described as "an excellent, earnest piece of pop music that feels individual and unique [...] funny because Williams is funny, not because it needs to be". 'Euroleague', the 7th track on the album, was featured as soundtrack for James Acaster's stand up tour and comedy special Cold Lasagne Hate Myself 1999.

References 

1992 births
Living people
People from Nelson, New Zealand
People educated at Nelson College
New Zealand male comedians
New Zealand stand-up comedians
New Zealand musicians
New Zealand podcasters